Constantin Dragomir (born 14 May 1927) was a Romanian bobsledder. He competed in the two-man and the four-man events at the 1956 Winter Olympics.

References

External links
 

1927 births
Possibly living people
Romanian male bobsledders
Olympic bobsledders of Romania
Bobsledders at the 1956 Winter Olympics
People from Comarnic